Meade County is the name of three counties in the United States:

 Meade County, Kansas 
 Meade County, Kentucky 
 Meade County, South Dakota